The following list of countries by air pollution sorts the countries of the world according to their average measured concentration of particulate matter (PM2.5) in micrograms per cubic meter (µg/m³). The World Health Organization's recommended limit is 10 micrograms per cubic meter, although there are also various national guideline values, which are often much higher. Air pollution is among the biggest health problems of modern industrial society and is responsible for more than 10 percent of all deaths worldwide (nearly 4.5 million premature deaths in 2019), according to The Lancet. Air pollution can affect nearly every organ and system of the body, negatively affecting nature and humans alike. Air pollution is a particularly big problem in emerging and developing countries, where global environmental standards often cannot be met. The data in this list refers only to outdoor air quality and not indoor air quality, which caused an additional two million premature deaths in 2019.

List 

All data are valid for the year 2020 and are taken from the Air Quality Life Index (ACLI) of the University of Chicago. In addition to particulate matter pollution, the modeled potential loss of life expectancy of the population due to particulate matter pollution is given.

References

External links 
 Air Quality Life Index (AQLI)

Countries
Countries
Countries
Countries
Pollution
Countries